Baghlachi may refer to:
 Baghlachi-ye Olya
 Baghlachi-ye Sofla